Selma Poutsma (born 14 May 1999) is Dutch short track speed skater who previously competed for France.

Biography
In 2014 Poutsma moved to France and competed for the French short track speed skating team, winning the bronze medal in the relay at the 2018 European Short Track Speed Skating Championships. In 2018 she moved back to the Netherlands and in 2020 started competing for the Netherlands. She won several medals at the 2021 European Short Track Speed Skating Championships and 2021 World Short Track Speed Skating Championships.

References

External links

1999 births
Living people
Dutch female short track speed skaters
French female short track speed skaters
World Short Track Speed Skating Championships medalists
Sportspeople from The Hague
Olympic short track speed skaters of the Netherlands
Short track speed skaters at the 2022 Winter Olympics
Medalists at the 2022 Winter Olympics
Olympic gold medalists for the Netherlands
Olympic medalists in short track speed skating